Loeb Stadium is a multi-use stadium in Columbian Park in Lafayette, Indiana, United States. It is the home field for the Lafayette Aviators, a collegiate summer baseball team in the Prospect League; for the Jefferson High School Bronchos baseball team; and for Black Cat FC in the United Premier Soccer League. Opened in 2021, Loeb Stadium has a capacity of 2,600 people.

Previous stadium
The previous Loeb Stadium, standing at the same location from 1940 to 2019, was also home to the Aviators and the Bronchos. At the conclusion of the 2019 Prospect League season, the old stadium was closed and demolished to make way for construction of the current stadium.

Construction
The $20 million project was paid for using economic development income tax (EDIT) rather than property taxes. The old stadium's configuration was flipped, placing home plate in what had been center field. The previous seating area was removed and made part of Columbian Park. New suites and outdoor group seating areas were added. The stadium's grass playing surface was replaced with a synthetic turf, allowing for additional types of events, and the playing surface was lowered by seven feet, allowing for improved sightlines from all stadium seats. The seating capacity was decreased from 3,500 to 2,600.

History
Loeb Stadium opened on March 31, 2021 with its first event being a men's baseball game between Jefferson High School and Central Catholic. In the stadium's first year, the Aviators played for the league championship at home, losing to the Cape Catfish on August 12, 2021. The first soccer game at Loeb Stadium on August 18, 2021 between the women's teams of Jefferson High School and Central Catholic.

References

Buildings and structures in Lafayette, Indiana
Baseball venues in Indiana
High school baseball venues in the United States
2021 establishments in Indiana
Sports venues completed in 2021
Soccer venues in Indiana